Mattias Beck (born  in Täby) is a Swedish professional ice hockey player (left wing), currently playing with SC Riessersee in the DEL2.

Beck played youth hockey with Viggbyholms IK before he played 11 games in AIK of the Elitserien (SEL) in the 2010–11 season. He later played four seasons with Mora IK of the HockeyAllsvenskan (Allsv).

On July 7, 2015, Beck left Sweden for the first time in his professional career, agreeing to a one-year deal with German club SC Riessersee of the DEL2.

Career statistics

Regular season and playoffs

International

References

External links
 

1983 births
AIK IF players
HV71 players
IK Oskarshamn players
Living people
Mora IK players
Örebro HK players
SC Riessersee players
Södertälje SK players
Swedish ice hockey left wingers
People from Täby Municipality
Sportspeople from Stockholm County